The third season of Nikita, an American drama/espionage television series based on the French film La Femme Nikita (1990), the remake Point of No Return (1993), and a previous series La Femme Nikita (1997), was announced in May 2012 and premiered on October 19, 2012.

Cast and characters

Main cast
 Maggie Q as Nikita Mears
 Shane West as Michael Bishop
 Lyndsy Fonseca as Alexandra "Alex" Udinov
 Aaron Stanford as Seymour Birkhoff
 Noah Bean as Ryan Fletcher
 Dillon Casey as Sean Pierce
 Devon Sawa as Owen Elliot
 Melinda Clarke as Helen "Amanda" Collins

Recurring cast
 Lyndie Greenwood as Sonya
 Peter Outerbridge as Ari Tasarov
 Michelle Nolden as President Kathleen Spencer
 David S. Lee as Phillip Jones
 Isaiah Mustafa as Cyrus

Episodes

Production
The series was renewed for a third season on May 11, 2012, which premiered on October 19, 2012. The show was filmed in Toronto, Ontario, Canada.

References

External links
 
 

2012 American television seasons
2013 American television seasons
Season 3